The 2016 Hart District Council election took place on 5 May 2016 to elect members of Hart District Council in England. This was on the same day as other local elections.

Results 
The election saw no gains or losses of seats, with each of the parties holding their incumbent seats up for election, meaning that the council composition remained the same.

Results by Ward

Blackwater and Hawley

Crookham East

Crookham West and Ewshot

Fleet Central

Fleet East

Fleet West

Hartley Wintney

Hook

Odiham

Yateley East

Yateley West

References

2016 English local elections
2016
2010s in Hampshire